James Macintosh Houston (born 21 November 1922) is a British-born Canadian theologian and academic who was Professor of Spiritual Theology and the first Principal of Regent College in Vancouver.

Biography 
Born on 21 November 1922, in Edinburgh, Scotland, Houston moved to Oxford in 1945 for doctoral studies in geography at the University of Oxford. His thesis was titled The Social Geography of the Huerta of Valencia. Houston was a fellow of Hertford College, Oxford, where he served as a geography lecturer.

Houston emigrated with his wife and four children to North America in 1970, and became one of the founders of Regent College, a graduate school of Christian studies. From 1970 to 1978, he was Principal of the college, and in 1991 he was appointed to the chair. His major areas of interest include the Christian mind, the Trinity, prayer, and spiritual formation. He has published numerous articles in books and scholarly journals. His autobiography, Memoirs of a Joyous Exile and a Worldly Christian, was published in 2020.

Houston currently resides in Vancouver. In addition to his continuation of writing, Houston spends a great deal of time mentoring students. Houston has four children, nine grandchildren, and fifteen great-grandchildren. Houston was the primary caretaker for his wife, Rita, who had dementia in her older years and died on 8 October 2014, at the age of 90.

Works

Books

 
 .
 .
 .
 .
 
 .
 .
 .
 .
 
 
 .
 .
 .
 .
 .
 .
 .
 .
 .
 .
 .
 .  1st ed. by Navpress, .

Edited work
 .
 .
 .
 .
 .
 .
 .
 .
 .
 .
 .

Notes

References

Footnotes

Works cited

Further reading

External links
 .
 .
James Houston's Personal Website.

1922 births
Academics in British Columbia
Canadian people of Scottish descent
Canadian Protestant theologians
Fellows of Hertford College, Oxford
Living people
Academics from Edinburgh
Plymouth Brethren
Academic staff of Regent College
Social geographers